Huestis is a surname. Notable people with the surname include:

David B. Huestis
Josh Huestis (born 1991), American basketball player
Marc Huestis (born 1954), American filmmaker
Marilyn Huestis (born 1948), American toxicologist
Stavert Huestis (born 1938), Canadian politician
Ella Huestis (born 2007), American author